The molecular formula C22H31N3O2 (molar mass: 369.50 g/mol, exact mass: 369.2416 u) may refer to:

 Solvent Yellow 124
 Piboserod

Molecular formulas